Kevin Peiris (born 24 March 1999) is a Sri Lankan cricketer. He made his Twenty20 debut for Bloomfield Cricket and Athletic Club in the 2018–19 SLC Twenty20 Tournament on 16 February 2019. He made his List A debut on 19 December 2019, for Kalutara Town Club in the 2019–20 Invitation Limited Over Tournament. He made his first-class debut on 31 January 2020, for Kalutara Town Club in Tier B of the 2019–20 Premier League Tournament.

References

External links
 

1999 births
Living people
Sri Lankan cricketers
Bloomfield Cricket and Athletic Club cricketers
Kalutara Town Club cricketers
Place of birth missing (living people)